Mieczysław Karaś (1924–1977) was a Polish linguist.

External links
Encyklopedia Krakowa

1924 births
1977 deaths
Burials at Rakowicki Cemetery
Members of the Polish Academy of Sciences
Linguists from Poland
20th-century linguists